Gwangjong of Goryeo (925 – 4 July 975), personal name Wang So, was the fourth king of Goryeo.

Biography

Birth and early life
Gwangjong was born in 925 as Wang So, fourth son of King Taejo, who had founded Goryeo in 918. His mother was Queen Sinmyeongsunseong of the Chungju Yu clan, who also gave birth to princes Wang Tae, Wang Yo, Wang Jeong, Jeungteong-guksa, as well as the princesses, Princess Nakrang and Princess Heungbang. Moreover, Gwangjong had twenty half-brothers and seven half-sisters from his father's other marriages.

As he had three older brothers, Mu, Tae and Yo, he was far from the succession to the throne; however, Wang Tae died early on, and Wang Mu died in 945, three years after being crowned king, leaving the throne to Wang Yo, who ruled Goryeo for four years as Jeongjong. Before dying, he decided to make Wang So his heir instead of his one and only son, Prince Gyeongchunwon.

According to contemporary Choe Seungno, Gwangjong "was careful and laconic, but bold if he had to seize an opportunity." He had excellent appearance and qualities, and he received a special love from his father.

During his time as a prince, he gave a great contribution in the crowning of Wang Yo as Jeongjong, and played a big role in removing opposing forces to the sovereigns: one was Wang Gyu, who had helped King Taejo in the founding of Goryeo, climbing to the position of prime minister, and who, after King Hyejong was crowned, tried to carry out a coup to raise his grandson, prince Gwangju, to the throne. The second one was Park Sul-hee, a general who promoted the appointment of Hyejong to Crown Prince and continued to support him later, becoming a threat to Jeongjong's coronation.

Reign

When Gwangjong ascended the throne on April 13, 949, at the age of 25, the kingdom of Goryeo was unstable: to unify the Later Three Kingdoms, his father Taejo made alliances with powerful and influential families through marriages. Keeping them satisfied was paramount, as those families all had their own armies and could rebel at any time. For this reason, Gwangjong felt the need to consolidate the power of the king and made the creation of an absolute monarchy the purpose of his entire government. To avoid an increase in the power and in the influence of noble families, he refused to marry a woman from a noble clan, but instead married into the royal family: Queen Daemok was his half-sister, whose mother came from the Hwangju Hwangbo family, while his second wife, Lady Gyeonghwa, was born by his elder half-brother Hyejong, the second king of Goryeo, and his first wife Queen Uihwa of the Jinju Im clan. Along with studying Taizong of Tang's book Difan to better understand what to do, as he found many similarities between his situation and that of Taizong, Gwangjong rewarded all those who contributed to the progress of Goryeo, also making much effort to maintain good diplomatic relations with neighboring countries. This allowed him to concentrate power from within and without the court, and, seven years after the start of his reign, enact a series of reforms to promote a stable and royal-centered political system, and to expand economy and military.

His first reform was the law of emancipation of slaves in 956. The noble families had many slaves, mainly prisoners of war, who served as private soldiers; they numbered more than commoners and didn't pay taxes to the crown, but to the clan they worked for. By emancipating them, Gwangjong turned them into commoners, weakening the noble families' power, and gaining people who paid taxes to the king and could become part of his army. This reform won his government the support of the people, while nobles were against it; even queen Daemok tried to stop the king as the law affected her family, but to no avail.

Regarding foreign policy, Gwangjong maintained the close connection between China and Goryeo which was made by Taejo of Goryeo, focusing on the relationship with Later Zhou and the Song dynasty. Many diplomats were sent back and forth between the two countries, as well as many goods. Gwangjong also built diplomatic relationships with Wuyue.

In 957, Later Zhou diplomat and scholar Shuang Ji was sent to Goryeo as an envoy. Gwangjong discovered his ability and requested him to stay; Shuang Ji agreed and worked as a Goryeo official: with his advice, Gwangjong instituted the national civil service examination in 958, with the goal to expel officials who gained court positions due to family influence or reputation rather than by merit. The examination, based on the Tang's civil service exam and the Confucian classics, was open to all male free-borns to give everyone, not only the rich and powerful people, the opportunity to work for the state, but in practice only sons of the gentry could gain the necessary education to take the exam; royal relatives of the five highest ranks were, instead, left out on purpose. In 960, the king introduced different colours for court robes to distinguish officials of different ranks.

During Gwangjong's reign, medical centers known as Daebi-won, which provided free medicines to poor patients, were set up in Kaesong and Pyongyang, later expanding in the provinces as the Hyeminguk. Taejo had established regional granaries to face the times of drought, and Gwangjong added jewibo, stores which charged interests on grain loans, which were then used for poor relief. These measures, even if in modified forms, kept on working for the next 900 years, parallel to better cultivation methods to keep up with the growth of population.

When emperor Shizong of Later Zhou died in 959, leaving the throne to his six-year-old son, the dynasty fell as the army, who was marching towards the northern border, defected and chose its commander Zhao Kuangyin as emperor. As Zhao decided to return from battlefield to found the Song dynasty, he left the mountains of Manchuria and the northern plains to Khitans and Jurchens. To improve Goryeo's defences, Gwangjong reorganized and expanded military, and built twelve garrisons along the northeast and northwest borders; also, under his reign, the kingdom moved the border beyond the Chongchon river, heading towards the Yalu river.

Gwangjong saw the association of religious institutions and the state as an aid to subdue local lords, and chose the abbot of Haeinsa Temple to promote Buddhism among the people. He took capable monks as advisers, and promoted the construction of temples: for example, he built the Yongjusa Temple in Cheongju, North Chungcheong, in 962, and the Cheongpyeongsa Temple in Chuncheon, Gangwon, in 973. The king also created an exam for Buddhist priests, called seonggwa, to link the government and the church, and he attempted to make peace between the Zen and textual schools to unify them under a single order, but he didn't have much success.

Other actions undertaken to reinforce the royal authority were naming Goryeo an empire and himself Emperor, thus ending tributary relationships with China; calling Kaesong the Imperial Capital and Pyongyang the Western Capital, and adopting the era name Gwangdeok from 949 to 951, and Junpung from 960 to 963. By placing himself in the position of the emperor, he tried to instill in his servants that he had an absolute power.

Gwangjong's reforms were not well-received by the nobles, especially by high military and civil officials who helped his father in the foundation of Goryeo. The dissent of the nobles led them to stage a rebellion, but this attempt failed. In his eleventh year of reign, 960, Gwangjong started a series of purges, killing off his opposers: among them, there were his brother Wang Won (ninth prince Hyoeun), who was suspected of treason and poisoned, king Hyejong's son prince Heunghwa, and king Jeongjong's son prince Gyeongchunwon. Gwangjong also mistrusted his eldest son Wang Ju, who was five years old at the time. At the end of the purges, only forty of Taejo's 3,200 meritorious subjects who helped him in unifying the Later Three Kingdoms were still alive.

Later years and death

In his later years, Gwangjong's reliance on Buddhism increased. In 968, after a nightmare, he convened a reunion and banned the slaughter of his family. In December 971, an earthquake occurred in Goryeo, and the nobles and the people blamed the king. Gwangjong managed to handle the situation, but a second earthquake occurred in February 972: during this time, he had a nightmare and granted amnesty to prisoners in August.

He developed a serious disease in July 975 (fifth month of the Lunar calendar) and died just a few days later at the age of 50. He was given the posthumous name of "Hongdoseon-yeolpyeongse sukheon-ui hyoganghye daeseong dae-wang", while his temple name Gwangjong means "shining emperor". His tomb, called Heolleung, is located on the north side of Mount Songak, in Kaepung County, North Korea. The site inspection in 1916 found a severely damaged tomb, but the stairway and the foundation stone are preserved.

He was succeeded by his only son Wang Ju, who became the fifth king of Goryeo, Gyeongjong. The reform policies to curb the power of the capital aristocracy were passed down to his successors, but they weren't able to pursue them; as a result, the bureaucracy turned from a meritorious aristocracy to a hereditary class. The law of emancipation of slaves was retracted during the sixth king's, Seongjong's reign.

Legacy
Gwangjong's bold reform policy weakened the nobles and stabilized the kingship. In addition, the national civil service examination caused the raise of a new wave of political forces, while a new cultural heritage was developed independently by taking inspiration from China. Though Hyejong and Jeongjong established their reigns by relying on strong power bases represented by general Park Sul-hee and uncle Wang Sik-ryeom, respectively, Gwangjong established his own power base, and, in order to restrain the power of wealthy people and influential vassals, he encouraged consanguineous marriages to avoid troubles with maternal relatives. He is regarded as the king who made the most strenuous and energetic efforts to strengthen the kingship in the early Goryeo.

His reforms contributed greatly to the formation of a new political order in the newborn kingdom of Goryeo, but they were mainly limited to politics; the restructuring of the local government, and the reorganization of national economy and social system were comparatively weak. He was always wary of the possibility of hostile acts, and killed nobles and relatives recklessly.

One of the most influential thinkers of the time was Choe Seungno, the son of a high-ranked official, who strongly opposed Gwangjong's autocracy. He believed that the privileges of the nobility were to be protected, and that having as officials the sons of provincial gentlemen with no power base at the court would put it in danger. Therefore, he condemned Gwangjong for his obsession with Buddhism and public projects, which, according to him, drove the kingdom into debt, and declared him a tyrant for his cruelty. In the memorial he drew up for the sixth king of Goryeo, Seongjong, he wrote:

Family
Father: Taejo of Goryeo (고려 태조)
Grandfather: Sejo of Goryeo (고려 세조)
Grandmother: Queen Wisuk (위숙왕후)
Mother: Queen Sinmyeong (신명왕후)
Grandfather: Yu Geung-dal (유긍달)
Consorts and their respective issue(s):
Queen Daemok of the Hwangju Hwangbo clan (대목왕후 황보씨); half younger sister.
Crown Prince Wang Ju (태자 왕주)
Prince Hyohwa (효화태자)
Wang Aji, Lady Cheonchu (왕아지 천추전부인)
Lady Bohwa (보화궁부인)
Queen Mundeok (문덕왕후)
Lady Gyeonghwa of the Jincheon Im clan (경화궁부인 임씨); half niece – No issue.
Worthy Consort, of the Gim clan (현비 김씨) – No issue.

In popular culture
Portrayed by Kim Sang-joong in the 2002–2003 KBS TV series The Dawn of the Empire.
 Portrayed by Jung Seung-woo in the 2009 KBS2 TV series Empress Cheonchu.
 Portrayed by Jang Hyuk in the 2015 MBC TV series Shine or Go Crazy.
 Portrayed by Lee Joon-gi in the 2016 SBS TV series Moon Lovers: Scarlet Heart Ryeo.

See also
List of Korean monarchs
History of Korea
List of Goryeo people

References

925 births
975 deaths
10th-century Korean monarchs
Familicides
Korean Buddhist monarchs